Vladimir Yakovlevich Kolpakchi (7 September 1899 in Kiev – 17 May 1961 in Moscow) was a Soviet general during World War II. For his role in the successful Vistula-Oder offensive he was awarded the title Hero of the Soviet Union on 6 April 1945.

He was the first commander of what became the famed Soviet 62nd Army, holding the post between July and August. He also lead the 30th Army between November 1942 and April 1943, Participating in the 1943 Battles of Rzhev, and the 69th Army from April 1944 to May 1945, participating in the Lublin-Brest Offensive and the Vistula-Oder Offensive, and finishing the War at the Battle of Berlin. Following the War, he had also lead the Baku Military District, 1st Red Banner Army and Northern Military Military District, before dying, among other Generals, in a helicopter crash on 17 May 1961.

References

1899 births
1961 deaths
Army generals (Soviet Union)
Heroes of the Soviet Union
Recipients of the Order of the Red Banner
Recipients of the Order of Suvorov, 1st class
Recipients of the Order of Kutuzov, 1st class
Recipients of the Order of the Cross of Grunwald, 1st class
Soviet military personnel of World War II
Military personnel from Kyiv
Frunze Military Academy alumni
Military Academy of the General Staff of the Armed Forces of the Soviet Union alumni